Brake-specific fuel consumption (BSFC) is a measure of the fuel efficiency of any prime mover that burns fuel and produces rotational, or shaft power. It is typically used for comparing the efficiency of internal combustion engines with a shaft output.

It is the rate of fuel consumption divided by the power produced. 
In traditional units, it measures fuel consumption in pounds per hour divided by the brake horsepower, lb/(hp⋅h); in SI units, this corresponds to the inverse of the units of specific energy, kg/J = s2/m2.

It may also be thought of as power-specific fuel consumption, for this reason. BSFC allows the fuel efficiency of different engines to be directly compared.

The term "brake" here as in "brake horsepower" refers to a historical method of measuring torque (see Prony brake).

The BSFC calculation (in metric units)

To calculate BSFC, use the formula

where:
 is the fuel consumption rate in grams per second (g/s)
 is the power produced in watts where  (W)
 is the engine speed in radians per second (rad/s)
 is the engine torque in newton metres (N⋅m)

The above values of r, and  may be readily measured by instrumentation with an engine mounted in a test stand and a load applied to the running engine.  The resulting units of BSFC are grams per joule (g/J)

Commonly BSFC is expressed in units of grams per kilowatt-hour (g/(kW⋅h)). The conversion factor is as follows:
BSFC [g/(kW⋅h)] = BSFC [g/J] × (3.6 × 106)

The conversion between metric and imperial units is:
BSFC [g/(kW⋅h)] = BSFC [lb/(hp⋅h)] × 608.277
BSFC [lb/(hp⋅h)] = BSFC [g/(kW⋅h)] × 0.001644

The relationship between BSFC numbers and efficiency
To calculate the actual efficiency of an engine requires the energy density of the fuel being used.

Different fuels have different energy densities defined by the fuel's heating value. The lower heating value (LHV) is used for internal-combustion-engine-efficiency calculations because the heat at temperatures below  cannot be put to use.

Some examples of lower heating values for vehicle fuels are:
Certification gasoline = 18,640 BTU/lb (0.01204 kW⋅h/g)
Regular gasoline   = 18,917 BTU/lb (0.0122222 kW⋅h/g)
Diesel fuel        = 18,500 BTU/lb (0.0119531 kW⋅h/g)

Thus a diesel engine's efficiency = 1/(BSFC × 0.0119531) and a gasoline engine's efficiency = 1/(BSFC × 0.0122225)

The use of BSFC numbers as operating values and as a cycle average statistic

Any engine will have different BSFC values at different speeds and loads. For example, a reciprocating engine achieves maximum efficiency when the intake air is unthrottled and the engine is running near its peak torque. The efficiency often reported for a particular engine, however, is not its maximum efficiency but a fuel economy cycle statistical average. For example, the cycle average value of BSFC for a gasoline engine is 322 g/(kW⋅h), translating to an efficiency of 25% (1/(322 × 0.0122225) = 0.2540). Actual efficiency can be lower or higher than the engine’s average due to varying operating conditions. In the case of a production gasoline engine, the most efficient BSFC is approximately 225 g/(kW⋅h), which is equivalent to a thermodynamic efficiency of 36%.

An iso-BSFC map (fuel island plot) of a diesel engine is shown. The sweet spot at 206 BSFC has 40.6% efficiency. The x-axis is rpm; y-axis is BMEP in bar (bmep is proportional to torque)

The significance of BSFC numbers for engine design and class

BSFC numbers change a lot for different engine designs, and compression ratio and power rating.  Engines of different classes like diesels and gasoline engines will have very different BSFC numbers, ranging from less than 200 g/(kW⋅h) (diesel at low speed and high torque) to more than 1,000 g/(kW⋅h) (turboprop at low power level).

Examples of values of BSFC for shaft engines
The following table takes values as an example for the specific fuel consumption of several types of engines. For specific engines values can and often do differ from the table values shown below. Energy efficiency is based on a lower heating value of 42.7 MJ/kg ( g/(kW⋅h)) for diesel fuel and jet fuel, 43.9 MJ/kg ( g/(kW⋅h)) for gasoline.

Turboprop efficiency is only good at high power; SFC increases dramatically for approach at low power (30% Pmax) and especially at idle (7% Pmax) :

See also
Fuel economy in automobiles
Energy-efficient driving
Fuel management systems
Marine fuel management
Thrust specific fuel consumption

References

Further reading
Reciprocating engine types
HowStuffWorks: How Car Engines Work
Reciprocating Engines at infoplease
Piston Engines US Centennial of Flight Commission
Effect of EGR on the exhaust gas temperature and exhaust opacity in compression ignition engines
Heywood J B 1988 Pollutant formation and control. Internal combustion engine fundamentals Int. edn (New York: Mc-Graw Hill) pp 572–577
Well-to-Wheel Studies, Heating Values, and the Energy Conservation Principle
 Exemplary maps for commercial car engines collected by ecomodder forum users

Fuel technology
Energy efficiency
Power (physics)